Cavaco is a Portuguese surname.

Notable people with this name include:
 Aníbal Cavaco Silva (born 1939), Portuguese politician, former President of the Portuguese Republic
 Maria Cavaco Silva (born 1938), the wife of Aníbal Cavaco Silva
 Luís Cavaco (born 1972), Portuguese footballer

See also 
 Cavaquinho, a Portuguese guitar
 Cavaco, Angola, a coastal town
 Cavacoa, a genus of Sub-Saharan plants

Portuguese-language surnames